Badamsha, also known as Batamshinskiy, (Badamşy, بادامشى; , Badamsha (Batamshinskiy)) is a town in Aktobe Region, west Kazakhstan. It has a population of 5,668.

References

Aktobe Region
Cities and towns in Kazakhstan